This is the list of Basic Education High Schools in Taungoo, in the Bago Region of Myanmar.

BEHS 1 Taungoo: Formerly, National High School. Government owned High School.
BEHS 2 Taungoo Formerly, National High School. Government owned High School.
BEHS 3 Taungoo:Formerly, Convent School run by Roman Catholic Diocese, now become Taungoo Educational College
BEHS 4 Taungoo: Formerly, St. Luke's High School run by the Taungoo Anglican Diocese. Nationalized in April 1965
BEHS 5 Taungoo: Formerly, Paku High School under the Paku Karen Baptist Association (American Baptist Mission). Nationalized in April 1965
BEHS 6 Taungoo: Formerly, Bunker High School under the Bwe Karen Baptist Association. Nationalized in April 1965
BEHS Natsingon: High school for children of military families. The principal is a military officer.
 BEHS 7 (Also known as Chinese Temple High School): became a Middle School in 1965 became a high(branch) school in 2014-2015 became a high school in 2015–2016.
 THS Toungoo (Technological High School (Toungoo)) .
BEHS 4Miles
BEHS Kaytumadi (Myothit)

High schools in Bago Region
Lists of schools